"I'm Not That Girl" is a showtune from the musical Wicked, based on the novel, "Wicked: The Life and Times of the Wicked Witch of the West", by Gregory Maguire. It was composed by Stephen Schwartz, originally recorded by Idina Menzel (original song) and Kristin Chenoweth (reprise) on November 10, 2003, and released on December 16, 2003.  It is a solo sung by the main character of the show, Elphaba Thropp (the future Wicked Witch of the West in The Wonderful Wizard of Oz) in the first act and Glinda in the reprise in the second act.

Context in Wicked
The song is performed midway through the first act. During the song, Elphaba expresses her love for the Winkie prince Fiyero, the most popular boy at Shiz and Glinda's boyfriend. She accepts that she knows that nothing can ever happen between them, as she 'wasn't born for the rose and the pearl', and is an unpopular girl with green skin. She also mentions that Fiyero has feelings for her, though this was unconfirmed. This song is reprised by Glinda in the musical's second act when Fiyero leaves her for Elphaba.

Kerry Ellis version

Kerry Ellis, who played Elphaba in the West End and the Broadway productions of Wicked, recorded a version of this song in 2008. In this version, the verses are rearranged and extra lyrics are added. It was also produced by Brian May with him on guitar; fitting more into the rock genre. The song was originally released on her extended play Wicked in Rock but was also featured on her debut album Anthems. It was released as a single on September 6, 2010, accompanied by track "Dangerland" as its B-side.

References

External links

2003 songs
Idina Menzel songs
Kristin Chenoweth songs
Kerry Ellis songs
Songs from Wicked (musical)
Songs written by Stephen Schwartz (composer)